Anwar Mohamed Ali (born 25 June 1971) is a Yemeni track and field sprint athlete who competed internationally for Yemen at the 1996 Summer Olympics.

Career
Ali competed in the 400 metres at the 1996 Summer Olympics held in Atlanta, Georgia, United States, he completed his heat in 50.81 seconds and finished eighth in his heat so didn't qualify for the next round.

References

External links
 

1971 births
Living people
Yemeni male sprinters
Olympic athletes of Yemen
Athletes (track and field) at the 1996 Summer Olympics
20th-century Yemeni people